Task Force Mustang is the deployment unit name for the Combat Aviation Brigade (CAB), 36th Infantry Division, Texas Army National Guard. The CAB completed a tour of duty in support of Operation Iraqi Freedom in the fall of 2007 when it was relieved by the 12th Combat Aviation Brigade, a similarly constituted regular army unit.

Current Structure

 1st Battalion (Attack), 149th Aviation Regiment
 2nd Battalion (General Support), 149th Aviation Regiment
 Company B, 1st Battalion (Security & Support), 114th Aviation Regiment
 Detachment 2, Company H, 171st Aviation Regiment
 Elements of:
 1st Battalion (Assault Helicopter), 108th Aviation Regiment
 449th Aviation Support Battalion

History

The CAB, 36th Infantry Division was the first National Guard combat air brigade under the Army's reformatting plan.

Task Force Mustang has previously deployed to Bosnia and Kosovo, and to the United States Gulf Coast in support of disaster operations following Hurricanes Katrina and Rita.

Global War on Terror

During the brigade's deployment to Iraq it was composed of over 2700 soldiers from 44 states. Approximately 2500 were from 16 state Army Guard units. The brigade was augmented by over 200 Individual Ready Reserve Army soldiers from 36 different states.

Task Force Mustang shipped to Iraq in September 2006 in support of Operation Iraqi Freedom, following a few weeks of boots on the ground training at Camp Buehring, Kuwait in August. They completed five months of flight and theatre immersion training at Fort Hood, Texas and Fort Sill, Oklahoma and were certified "Fit to Fight" by Lt. Gen. Russel L. Honoré, commanding general, First U.S. Army, on 30 July 2006.

In the first eight months in Iraq, the CAB's units flew 51,000 combat flight hours while executing almost 7,300 combat missions. 36 CAB has carried more than 230,000 passengers, moved more than 15 million pounds of cargo, conducted almost 60 large combat air assaults, provided outstanding Medical evacuation (medevac) support to save many soldiers' lives, and supported ground troops with AH-64 Apaches.

Elements deployed to Iraq
 HHC Combat Aviation Brigade, 36th Infantry Division – Headquarters and Headquarters Company
homebase: Austin-Bergstrom International Airport, Austin, Texas.
  1st Battalion, 149th Aviation Regiment (Attack)(Commander, MAJ(P) Stacy Rostorfer)
homebase: Ellington Field, Houston, Texas
  2d Battalion, 135th Aviation Regiment – (Commander, LTC Christopher Petty, Command Sergeant Major, CSM Douglas Imfeld)
homebase: Buckley Air Force Base, Aurora, Colorado
  1st Battalion, 131st Aviation Regiment
homebase: Montgomery, Alabama Army National Guard
  1st Battalion, 108th Aviation Regiment
homebase: Topeka, Kansas
Unit became operational in Iraq on 1 November 2006 and was the last CAB unit to do so for the current Iraq deployment.
 449th Support Battalion (Aviation) {Commander, LTC Travis (The Banker) Richards, Command Sergeant Major, CSM Monroe (John Wayne) Kelinske, HSC 449th ASB Commander, 1LT Michael McDonald, and 1SG Karl Thomas}, XO, MAJ Dave Cooper, S1, CPT Carry (Barbie Doll) Allen, S6, CPT Raymond (The Man) Simms, CSSAMO, MAJ Terry Biddle
homebase: San Antonio, Texas
 OSACOM Battalion (Operational Support Airlift Command) – a mix of units that came together in October 2006 and will wear the 36th Inf Div patch while serving in Iraq over the next year. OSACOM flies the C-23 Sherpa.
  C Co (Air Ambulance), 1st Battalion, 111th Aviation Regiment – Home stations are in Arkansas and Florida, unit attached to 2nd Battalion (General Support), 135th Aviation Regiment in 2006 as an additional MEDEVAC Company in support of OIF.

Army Guard unit personnel contributions
Arizona :1
 Texas: 1000
 Colorado: 325
 Alabama: 300
 Kansas: 225
 Arkansas: 150
 Missouri: 100
 Minnesota: 100
 Nebraska: 90
 Iowa: 50
 Ohio: 50
 Utah: 40
 Mississippi: 40
 California: 30
 Georgia: 25
 New York: 25
 South Carolina: 15
 Pennsylvania: 15
 Puerto Rico:  1
 Florida 70
 Illinois 1
 Vermont 3

All troop strength numbers are approximate.

The unit flew approximately 18 AH-64 Apache, 80 UH-60 Black Hawk, 12 CH-47 Chinook helicopters.

References

External links
 News article 4 August 2006.
 US First Army website, 30 July 2006.
 Rocky Mountain News, 28 July 2006.
 US First Army press release, 28 June 2006
 Austin American-Statesman, 28 June 2006.
 San Antonio Express News article, 8 April 2006.
 Texas Guard publication, 5 April 2006.
 Summary of Army National Guard Aviation units, last date updated unknown.

Military units and formations in Colorado
Combat Aviation Brigade 36
Ad hoc units and formations of the United States Army